Athens Christian School (ACS) is a private, non-denominational Christian school located in Athens, Georgia, United States.

History
In the late 1960s, the Christian school movement in America began to grow at a rapid pace.  At this time, Buhl and Lois Cummings owned a Christian bookstore in Athens, Georgia.  Many patrons of the bookstore talked to the Cummings about the need for an alternative to public education, since the Supreme Court had removed Bible reading and prayer from the public schools.  When God was taken out of public education, the Cummings and many others saw the need to start a school in Athens that would educate students from a Biblical worldview.  This was the reason Athens Christian School was started.   "But to Minister, My Life and Ministry," by Buhl Cummings.

When the school was founded in 1970, the initial enrollment was consisted of white children whose parents wanted to avoid enrolling them in racially integrated public schools. According to the historian Ashton Ellett, white elites enrolled their children in Athens Christian School as part of the transition to class based system of racial exclusion that was nominally colorblind and revolved around the rhetoric of individual rights, personal freedom, and meritocratic enrollment.

Academics
ACS is accredited by the Georgia Accrediting Commission.

Notable alumni
Alan Busenitz, baseball player

References

External links
 

Christian schools in Georgia (U.S. state)
Educational institutions established in 1970
Schools in Clarke County, Georgia
Buildings and structures in Athens, Georgia
Nondenominational Christian schools in the United States
Segregation academies in Georgia